Huge may refer to:

 Huge cardinal, a number in mathematics
 Huge (Caroline's Spine album), 1996
 Huge (Hugh Hopper and Kramer album), 1997
 Huge (TV series), a television series on ABC Family
 Huge (digital agency)
 Huge (magazine), a style magazine published by Kodansha in Japan
 Human Genome Equivalent, a genomic sequence as long as the human genome, which can be used as a unit
 Huge (film), a 2010 film directed by Ben Miller
 The Huge Crew, trio of female bullies from Ned's Declassified School Survival Guide

See also
 Hu Ge (disambiguation)